Asclepias cryptoceras is a species of milkweed known by the common names jewel milkweed, pallid milkweed, Humboldt Mountains milkweed, and cow-cabbage. It is native to the Great Basin of western North America, where it grows in many types of habitat, especially dry areas. This is a perennial herb growing low against the ground or drooping. It arises from a fleshy, woody rhizome-like root. The thick leaves are round to heart-shaped and arranged oppositely on the short stem. The inflorescence is a cluster of small flowers with centers of bright to dull pink hoods surrounded by pale-colored reflexed corollas. The fruit is a follicle held erect on a small stalk.

The Northern Paiute used the plant as a medicinal remedy, preparing the roots for headache and sores, and the latex for ringworm.

References

External links
The Jepson eFlora 2013
CalPhotos

cryptoceras
Flora of the Western United States